Richard Hugh Francis Jones (born 28 September 1962) is a British diplomat. He was Ambassador to Albania from 2003 to 2006. He has been European Union ambassador to Switzerland and Liechtenstein from January 2012 to 2016.

References

External links

1962 births
Living people
People educated at Dulwich College
Alumni of Merton College, Oxford
Ambassadors of the United Kingdom to Albania
Ambassadors of the European Union to Switzerland
Ambassadors of the European Union to Liechtenstein
British officials of the European Union